The People's Party for Reconstruction and Democracy ( or PPRD) is a political party in the Democratic Republic of the Congo. It is the political structure established by the former president of the country, Joseph Kabila.

In the 2006 general election the PPRD won 111 out of 500 seats in the lower house of parliament and became the largest party in parliament. The 2006 general election was the first free election since the 1960s.  On November 27, 2006, the presidential candidate supported by the PPRD, Joseph Kabila, was declared the winner of the 2006 Presidential elections, by the Supreme Court of Justice.
In the 19 January 2007 Senate elections, the party won 22 out of 108 seats.

In the 2011 general election, the PPRD lost nearly half of its seats in the lower house of parliament, dropping to 63 out of 500 seats. Nevertheless, the PPRD retained its position as the largest party in parliament.

The party is the leading component of the Alliance of the Presidential Majority, which is the majority bloc in the National Assembly.

Electoral history

Presidential Elections

National Assembly elections

Senate elections

References 

2002 establishments in the Democratic Republic of the Congo
Political parties in the Democratic Republic of the Congo
Social democratic parties in Africa
Socialism in the Democratic Republic of the Congo